Bruce Morton may refer to:

 Bruce Morton (journalist) (1930–2014), American journalist and television news correspondent
 Bruce Morton (mathematician) (1926–2012), Australian/New Zealand applied mathematician